Lázaro Cárdenas was President of Mexico from 1934 to 1940.

Lázaro Cárdenas may also refer to:

 Lázaro Cárdenas Batel, governor of Michoacán from 2002 to 2008
 Lázaro Cárdenas, Baja California, Mexico
 Lázaro Cárdenas, Michoacán, Mexico
 Port of Lázaro Cárdenas 
 Lázaro Cárdenas Municipality, Quintana Roo, Mexico
 Lázaro Cárdenas Municipality, Tlaxcala, Mexico
 Lázaro Cárdenas, Jalisco, Mexico
 Lázaro Cárdenas Airport, in Michoacán, Mexico
 Lázaro Cárdenas metro station (Mexico City), Mexico
 Lázaro Cárdenas metro station (Tlaquepaque), Jalisco, Mexico
 Lázaro Cárdenas Elementary School, a K-8 school of the Chicago Public Schools in Little Village, Chicago

See also
 Statue of Lázaro Cárdenas (disambiguation)